Funsho Adeolu  (born 9 May 1968) is a Nigerian actor, film director and film producer.

Early life
Adeolu was born on 9 May 1968 in Ondo State, southwestern Nigeria.
Funsho went to Baptist Academy. He has consistently been credited for Countdown at Kusini, a movie that featured his namesake, the late Oba Funsho Adeolu, the Alaaye of Ode Remo (who played Chief Eleyinmi in the old Nigerian Sitcom "The Village Headmaster"). Ibidun Allison was the other Nigerian actor in Countdown at Kusini (Amebo of "The Village Headmaster"). 
He featured in Heroes and Zeroes, a 2012 Nigerian drama film.

Personal life
Adeolu is married to Mrs. Victoria Adeolu and has two sons.

Awards and nominations

See also
 List of Nigerian film producers
 List of Yoruba people

References

Nigerian film directors
Nigerian film producers
Nigerian screenwriters
Nigerian dramatists and playwrights
1968 births
Living people
Male actors from Ondo State
20th-century Nigerian male actors
21st-century Nigerian male actors
Yoruba male actors
Male actors in Yoruba cinema
Nigerian male television actors